The 1988 Pilkington Glass Championships was a women's tennis tournament played on grass courts at the Devonshire Park Lawn Tennis Club in Eastbourne in the United Kingdom and was part of Category 4 tier of the 1988 WTA Tour. The tournament ran from 13 June until 19 June 1988. First-seeded Martina Navratilova won the singles title, her seventh at the event.

Finals

Singles

 Martina Navratilova defeated  Natasha Zvereva 6–2, 6–2
 It was Navratilova's 6th singles title of the year and the 135th of her career.

Doubles

 Eva Pfaff /  Elizabeth Smylie defeated  Belinda Cordwell /  Dianne van Rensburg 6–3, 7–6(8–6)
 It was Pfaff's 3rd title of the year and the 7th of her career. It was Smylie's only title of the year and the 21st of her career.

Notes

References

External links
 Official website
 ITF tournament edition details
 Tournament draws

Pilkington Glass Championships
Eastbourne International
Pilkington Glass Championships
Pilkington Glass Championships
1988 in English women's sport